Pak Nam-chol (born July 2, 1985) is a North Korean international footballer who predominantly played as an attacking midfielder.

Pak has appeared for North Korea in various FIFA World Cup qualifying matches since 2006, scoring three goals. He was also in the North Korea squad that qualified and played at the 2010 FIFA World Cup.

Pak is described as the best North Korean player at the moment, and is the most capped player of the national team with 74 appearances.

International goals
Scores and results list North Korea's goal tally first.

Honors

International
AFC Challenge Cup: 2012

Individual
2012 AFC Challenge Cup Most Valuable Player

References

External links
 
 
 

1985 births
Living people
Sportspeople from Pyongyang
North Korean footballers
North Korean expatriate footballers
North Korea international footballers
2010 FIFA World Cup players
2011 AFC Asian Cup players
Association football forwards
Association football wingers
Expatriate footballers in Thailand
April 25 Sports Club players
Pak Nam-chol
Pak Nam-chol
Pak Nam-chol
Footballers at the 2006 Asian Games
Footballers at the 2010 Asian Games
Asian Games competitors for North Korea
North Korean expatriate sportspeople in Thailand